FC Solothurn is a Swiss football club based in Solothurn. The club has played in Nationalliga B (2nd level), and currently plays at 1. Liga (Group 2) (3rd level).

History

From season 1925–26 to 1930–31, when a new system got introduced, FC Solothurn played in the highest football league in Switzerland.

The former manager of Grasshopper Club Zürich, Hanspeter Latour, managed FC Solothurn for 13 years in 1983–1996. In the 1997–98 season the club reached the Promotion Group to the Nationalliga A and missed the promotion by one point. 2001 the club was in the last place in the Nationalliga B and was relegated to the 1. Liga, where it plays since then.

Recent seasons
2000–01: Nationalliga B 8th in Abstiegsrunde (relegated)
2001–11: 1. Liga

Honours
 Uhrencup: 1998

Current squad

Out on loan

 
Solothurn
Solothurn
Canton of Solothurn
1901 establishments in Switzerland